Bruno Baveni (born 15 December 1939 in Sestri Levante) is a retired Italian football player and coach.

A defender, he played 6 seasons (92 games, 8 goals) in the Serie A for Genoa C.F.C. and A.C. Milan.

Honours
Milan
 Serie A champion: 1967–68.
 Coppa Italia winner: 1966–67.
 European Cup winner: 1968–69.

References

1939 births
Living people
Italian footballers
Serie A players
Genoa C.F.C. players
A.C. Milan players
A.C. Trento 1921 players
Italian football managers
Casale F.B.C. managers
S.S.D. Sanremese Calcio managers
Association football defenders
U.S. Imperia 1923 managers